Ryan Choi is a superhero appearing in American comic books published by DC Comics. Created by Gail Simone and Grant Morrison, the character first appeared in DCU: Brave New World #1 (August 2006) as the third superhero character to use the Atom name in the DC Universe. He emigrated to the United States following the death of his mother, to take up his idol Ray Palmer's former position at Ivy University. He went on to become a member of the Justice League.

In the DC Extended Universe film Justice League (2017), Ryan Choi was portrayed by Zheng Kai, but his scenes were cut from the theatrical version. His appearance was restored for the 2021 director's cut of the film, Zack Snyder's Justice League. Osric Chau portrayed Ryan Choi in the Arrowverse crossover "Crisis on Infinite Earths" and The Flashs eighth season.

Publication history
Ryan Choi first appeared in DCU: Brave New World and was created by Gail Simone and Grant Morrison. Choi, as described by DC solicitations, is "a young hotshot professor who's filling the extra spot on Ivy University's teaching staff... and who inadvertently ends up filling the old Atom's super-heroic shoes".

In a Facebook post from 2017, Simone claimed that Ryan Choi was entirely her creation: "Grant Morrison did NOT create Ryan Choi. I envisioned him, developed him and named him. I was given some rough story ideas by Grant, I am sure they were brilliant, but I didn’t read them. My entire Atom pitch was lifted from a pitch I wrote for Impulse that did not get used".

Choi makes his first appearance in the new Rebirth continuity in the Justice League of America: The Atom one-shot, by Steve Orlando and Andrew MacDonald. His suit is redesigned to resemble Ray Palmer's in the Arrowverse TV shows.

Fictional character biography
Born in Hong Kong, Ryan Choi was a longtime protégé of Ray Palmer who had been corresponding with him through letters. After Palmer's disappearance, Ryan moved to Ivy Town in America to assume his mentor's place on the staff of Ivy University. Following clues left by Palmer, Ryan discovered a "bio-belt", allegedly the size and density-manipulating device used by his predecessor, and became the new Atom with Palmer's apparent blessing. Though taken with the superhero lifestyle, Ryan is a scientist first and foremost and approaches many of his adventures from the perspective of scientific discovery and investigation.

Since taking his mentor's place, Ryan has found himself at the center of a conflict between the forces of science and magic. It has been claimed that the impossible feats performed by Ray Palmer during his superheroic career caused the very fabric of reality to warp in Ivy Town's vicinity, making it a nexus of paranormal activity. Many parties, including the ancient "Cancer God" M'Nagalah and the microscopic aliens known as "the Waiting", consider Ryan a key player in the war and have made attempts to recruit, capture, or kill him. He is advised by, among others, Ivy Town Police Chief Liza Warner (a.k.a. Lady Cop).

As the Atom, Ryan has faced numerous challenges, including the shrinking serial killer Dwarfstar, his strict and disapproving father, and being seduced, kidnapped, and even swallowed alive by the size-changing villainess, Giganta. Through it all, his ingenuity and keen deductive mind have served him in good stead.

Ryan Choi was involved in the search for the missing Ray Palmer, traveling into the restored Multiverse along with Donna Troy, Jason Todd and a Monitor nicknamed "Bob". Literally plucked back to New Earth, he leaves his role of dimension-hopper to Kyle Rayner, returning to defend Ivy Town from a monster invasion. Later he is led to a mistaken belief that Ray Palmer has become an egocentric madman, and Ryan himself may be only a pawn of his mad fantasies. This is later revealed to be a ploy by Ray's old nemesis, Chronos. The All New Atom series ended with issue #25, when Ryan, with some help from the returned Ray Palmer, is able to discern between the truth and the lies fed by Chronos and his new assistant, Lady Chronos, a former sweetheart of Ryan turned to crime. Ryan eventually discovers that Ray Palmer never knew of Choi: instead the bio-belt was a tainted gift from Jia, and the Ray Palmer letters a clever forging by Chronos, meant to force Ryan into accepting the Atom mantle, and taking the blame for the staging menaces sent against the city. However, due to Ryan's ability into sorting out the mess, besting the Chronos couple and restoring Ivy to normalcy, Ray finally gives him his blessing.

Ryan expresses his desire to find a new identity for himself, since Ray, despite giving him his blessing earlier, had resumed using regularly his Atom identity. In Justice League: Cry For Justice #1, Ray and Ryan are seen fighting Killer Moth together, and at the end of the battle both of them show respect towards each other, with Ray asking Ryan to continue using the Atom name.

Brightest Day
During the Brightest Day event, Ryan is murdered by Deathstroke and his new team of Titans during their first mission. His corpse is then delivered in a matchbox to Dwarfstar, who is revealed to be the person who hired the Titans. His death caused some minor controversy, given both its timing and the supposed "lighter" new direction of DC Comics. A short time after Ryan's death, Deathstroke is briefly shown dismantling his bio-belt for some unknown purpose. In an interview done during Comic-Con International 2010, Titans writer Eric Wallace stated that Choi's death would have major repercussions for the team, and would bring the Titans into conflict with the wider DCU.

Later, Ray begins an investigation into the disappearance of Ryan who, unbeknownst to the superhero community, has been murdered. Ray comforts Ryan's girlfriend Amanda, and muses that Ryan may be hiding out like Ray did after the events of Identity Crisis. Amanda Waller eventually tells Giganta about Dwarfstar's hand in Ryan's murder, though it is unknown if she revealed the involvement of Deathstroke and the Titans. After stealing Dwarfstar's belt (thus rendering him powerless), Giganta pummels him into submission and tapes his mouth shut, telling him that she plans on taking her time to torture him. Later, Ray discovers evidence that Dwarfstar had a hand in Ryan's death, and vows to find him and make him pay. Ray eventually finds Dwarfstar in a hospital, where he is recovering from the severe injuries he sustained from his torture at the hands of Giganta. Believing that it may lead to a lighter sentence, Dwarfstar confesses to hiring Slade to kill Ryan. Armed with this knowledge, Ray leaves to inform the Justice League, but not before telling Dwarfstar that Deathstroke will likely kill him for his betrayal. The members of the Justice League finally confront Deathstroke and Titans on their way back from a disastrous mission, intending to arrest them for Ryan's murder. Ray seriously injures Deathstroke for killing his friend, but the Titans ultimately escape due to the intervention of Isis and Osiris. After failing, Ray sets out to write the eulogy for Ryan's funeral, with encouragement from Superman. It is also revealed that Deathstroke dismantled Ryan's bio-belt to utilize the technology to revive his dying son, Jericho. Later, Ray, Amanda, the Justice League, the Teen Titans and numerous other heroes are shown at the funeral honoring Ryan's memory.

Convergence
At San Diego Comic-Con 2011, artist Jim Lee revealed that Ryan would be one of the members of the new Justice League title drawn by Lee and written by Geoff Johns. The undoing of Choi's death will be one of the numerous changes to DC's continuity caused by the Flashpoint event.

During the first story arc of the series, it is mentioned in passing that as a young graduate student, Ryan had helped design one of the components of Cyborg's robotic body.

In the Convergence crossover, when the alternate Brainiac miniaturized the universe of the New Earth, Ryan appears to be alive and confronts Ray Palmer, who was battling the Angor universe's Barracuda. Ryan reveals that after his death, his consciousness had survived in the universe where the Atoms' masses are shifted to whenever they change size. He later returns to the realm of the living after appropriating the flesh from Ray's severed hand to create a new body for himself. After Barracuda is defeated, the two Atoms work together to defeat Deathstroke, avenging Ryan's murder.

DC Rebirth
Ryan makes his official debut in the new DC Rebirth continuity as a teenage genius Ivy League college student tutored by Ray Palmer. Palmer reveals his identity as the Atom and enlists Ryan's help in fighting crime, talking to Ray from his lab in a tech support role. One day, after many adventures together, Ray goes missing. A week later, Ryan finds a message from Palmer along with one of his size-changing belts, asking the youth to come find him in the Microverse because he got stuck there when exploring a change in time and space. After receiving another scolding from Dean Plumm, Ryan heads back to the lab, using the bio-belt that Ray gave him to travel there through the Wi-Fi. When he arrives, he is met by Batman and Lobo who are there to recruit Ray Palmer into the new Justice League of America. Discovering that Ray is missing, Batman decides to leave until Lobo asks Ryan if he wrote down various equations to update the bio-belt on a blackboard. Impressed, Lobo decides that Batman should recruit Ryan, despite Batman not wanting to put him in danger. Lobo says it is Ryan's choice, and Ryan joins the JLA and sometime later, heads to the City of Vanity, Oregon, to recruit the Ray into the team.

Powers and abilities
Ryan Choi's abilities stand identical to that of his mentor and friend Ray Palmer, the original Atom. Having the capability to change size, mass, and weight at will through a dwarf star powered device known as the Quantum Bio-Belt, he can shrink down beyond the particle scale. This enables Ryan, in his own words, to miniaturize himself while retaining full physique at this level. Initially, he could only do so due to the belt his predecessor's enemy, Lady Chronos had made for him. But after time of using the senior physicist's invention, he eventually contracted odd microorganisms that bonded to his blood cells on a genetic level. These small matter-devouring creatures allowed him similar 100% bodily control over the molecular physiological structure as his science teacher. Essentially letting him grow or shrink without the need of a belt under his own willpower. As Ryan, he possesses expertise in physics.

Collected editions

In other media
Television
 Ryan Choi / Atom appears in Batman: The Brave and the Bold, voiced by James Sie. Additionally, an alternate universe version named Dyna-Mite''' (also voiced by Sie and not to be confused with the Marvel Comics character of the same name or Dan the Dyna-Mite) appears in the episode "Deep Cover for Batman!" as a member of the Injustice Syndicate.
 Ryan Choi appears in media set in the Arrowverse, portrayed by Osric Chau.
 Choi first appears in the crossover event "Crisis on Infinite Earths", where he is recruited by heroes from across the multiverse to combat the Anti-Monitor due to Choi's status as the Paragon of Humanity.
 An alternate timeline version of Choi who became the Atom appears in season eight of The Flash.

Film
 An alternate universe version of Ryan Choi appears in Justice League: Gods and Monsters, voiced by Eric Bauza.
 The director of Justice League, Zack Snyder, revealed via his personal Vero account that he intended to include Ryan Choi in the film, having cast Zheng Kai in the role and filmed a scene for him. While Kai's appearance was cut from the final film during post-production, photos were publicly released online. The scene was later included in the director's cut, Zack Snyder's Justice League.
 Ryan Choi / Atom appears in Lego DC Comics Super Heroes: The Flash, voiced again by Eric Bauza.
 Ryan Choi / Atom appears in Injustice, voiced by an uncredited Yuri Lowenthal.

Video games
 Ryan Choi / Atom appears as a playable character in Injustice 2, voiced by Matthew Yang King. He appears as part of the "Fighter Pack 3" DLC. In his single-player ending, he upgrades his suit with Brainiac's technology to go subatomic and enter the Microverse to rescue his mentor, Ray Palmer.
 Ryan Choi / Atom appears as a playable character in Lego DC Super-Villains, voiced by Jason Marsden.
 Ryan Choi / Atom appears in Scribblenauts Unmasked: A DC Comics Adventure''.

References

Characters created by Gail Simone
Characters created by Grant Morrison
Comics characters introduced in 2006
Chinese-American superheroes
DC Comics male superheroes
DC Comics characters who are shapeshifters
DC Comics scientists
Fictional professors
Fictional physicists
Fictional characters who can change size
Fictional Chinese people
Fictional immigrants to the United States
Fictional Hong Kong people
Fighting game characters